Kalaloch  is an unincorporated resort area entirely within Olympic National Park in western Jefferson County, Washington, United States. Kalaloch accommodations (lodge, cabins, and campgrounds) are on a  bluff overlooking the Pacific Ocean, west of U.S. Route 101 on the Olympic Peninsula, north of the reservation of the Quinault Indian Nation.

The name Kalaloch is a corruption of the Quinault term k'–E–le–ok, pronounced Kq–â-lā'–ȯk, meaning "a good place to land", "canoe launch and landing", or "sheltered landing". The site was one of the few safe landing sites for dugout canoes between the Quinault River and Hoh River.

Kalaloch is served by the Forks, Washington ZIP Code 98331.

History

Artifacts discovered in Olympic National Park are evidence early humans inhabited the Olympic Peninsula 6,000 to 12,000 years ago. Today eight tribes (Elwha Klallam, Hoh, Jamestown S'Klallam, Makah, Port Gamble, Quileute, Quinault, S'Klallam, and Skokomish) live in reservations along the shores. In 1855 and 1856 Olympic Peninsula tribes ceded their lands and waters to the federal government.

In 1889, Washington became a state. President Grover Cleveland created the Olympic Forest Reserve in 1897, which was renamed to Olympic National Forest in 1907. Charles W. Becker, Sr., purchased a  coastal plot just south of where Kalaloch Creek meets the Pacific Ocean in 1925. Becker used milled lumber from driftwood logs that washed up on the beach to build the main lodge and cabins.

To preserve some of Washington's primeval forest lands, in 1938, President Franklin D. Roosevelt designated  as Olympic National Park. Two years later, President Roosevelt added  to the park. President Harry S. Truman added  of coastal wilderness to the Park in 1953, including the Kalaloch area. In 1976 the Olympic National Park was designated as an International Biosphere Reserve. The National Park Service purchased the Becker property in 1978 and renamed it Kalaloch Lodge. Olympic National Park was designated in 1981 as a World Heritage Site. In 1988, Congress approved the designation of 95 percent of the park as the Olympic Wilderness.

Weather and climate

Kalaloch weather is influenced by prevailing Pacific winds and two temperate rain forests, the Hoh Rainforest and the Quinault Rainforest. Annual rainfall at Kalaloch is measured in feet: on average,  fall annually.

Recreation

About  of beach in the Olympic National Park provide  beachcombing opportunities. At Kalaloch, seven area beach trails lead to coastal hikes and Kalaloch Creek. Fishing possibilities at Kalaloch include surf perch, salmon, or native trout, or at low tide visitors may dig for razor clams. Bald eagles, black-legged kittiwakes, red-throated loons, black scoters, and brown pelicans are among birdwatchers' sightings at Kalaloch. From Kalaloch bluffs, whale watchers may see migratory gray whales, and sea lions, harbor porpoise, harbor seals, sea otters and orcas may also be spotted.

The National Park Service staffs a ranger station in the area during the summer.

Resort accommodations
Kalaloch Lodge offers three types of accommodations: lodge, cabins, and campground.

Kalaloch Lodge has been named Best Place to Watch a Sunset in the Best Northwest Escapes awards by Seattle NBC affiliate KING5.

Forty cabins are available, including six on the bluff overlooking the ocean. The Kalaloch Lodge proprietors note, "In order to enhance your enjoyment of the surrounding natural beauty, all Kalaloch Lodge Cabins do NOT have in-room phones, WiFi/Internet access, or televisions".

Kalaloch Campground, with 166 camp sites, is one of four campgrounds in Olympic National Park accepting summer reservations. The few oceanfront campsites fill up fast so plan ahead and reserve with plenty of time.

See also 
List of names in English with counterintuitive pronunciations

References

External links
 
 
 
 

Unincorporated communities in Washington (state)
Unincorporated communities in Jefferson County, Washington